Mario D'Agata (29 May 1926 – 4 April 2009) was an Italian professional boxer, who was the first, and so far only, deaf world champion in boxing. He was a lineal, European, and Italian bantamweight champion.

Early life
D'Agata was born on 29 May 1926, in Arezzo, Italy. He had a tough childhood as a consequence of his disabilities, the victim of taunting from fellow school children. Feeling the need to prove himself equal, he resorted to street fighting as a way to demonstrate his equality. D'Agata was one of three children (out of seven) to be born deaf in his family. His parents moved him from Tuscany to Rome at an early age, hoping to find doctors who would cure him.

One afternoon he noticed a poster of a boxer adorning the door to a boxing gym. Upon entering he was enamored with how the boxers practiced their fighting in a polished, stylized way. D'Agata was drawn into boxing from that moment on. Due to the outbreak of the Second World War, however, D'Agata had to wait until he was 20 years old to fight as an amateur. In 1946, he began an amateur career that saw him win 90 out of 110 bouts.

Professional career
On 14 October 1950, D'Agata turned professional, defeating Giuseppe Saladari by a decision in six rounds. He built a record of 10–0 with 1 knockout before suffering his first loss, at the hands of Romolo Re, 2 August 1951, by a decision in ten. Another loss to Re would follow, but D'Agata was able to build a 19–3–2 record with 4 knockouts before challenging for the Italian bantamweight title, on 26 September 1953, beating Gianni Zuddas by a disqualification in round nine to claim the belt. After five more wins, he travelled to Tunisia, where he met the future world champion Robert Cohen, losing a ten-round decision. After two more wins, he embarked on what would have been a long tour of Australia, a trip cut short after three wins when he was shot by his associate.

D'Agata then returned to Italy, where he was no longer recognized as champion. On 25 May 1955, he defeated Arthur Emboule by decision in eight rounds, in his first bout after the shooting. After eight more wins in a row (which raised his winning streak to a total of thirteen wins in a row), he was given a shot at the European bantamweight title by Andre Valignat on 29 October of the same year, and he defeated Valignat by a fifth round disqualification.

On 29 June 1956, D'Agata finally received his world title opportunity, when former conqueror Cohen gave him a chance to win the world bantamweight title in Rome. D'Agata made his dream come true by knocking Cohen out in six rounds in front of 38,000 fans, many of whom rushed to the ring the moment the fight was over, carrying D'Agata out of the ring on their arms. With that win, D'Agata made history as the first deaf world champion of boxing.

D'Agata went to Paris to defend his title for the first time, on 1 April 1957, against local challenger Alphonse Halimi. Special lights had been set specially for this fight, so that D'Agata, who could not hear the bell after each round, would be able to tell when each round was finished. These lights would flash the moment the bell rang. There was a storm on the day of the fight, which was held in an open-air area. Lightning struck one of the special lights in round three, and D'Agata was struck by sparkles, suffering a burned neck and back. It was decided the fight would go on, and D'Agata tried to defy the odds for the remaining of the fight, but he lost the title by a fifteen-round decision.

D'Agata never received a rematch from Halimi. He then fought on with mixed success, until 1 August 1962, when he announced his retirement. He was able to stay away from boxing for the rest of his life.

Legacy
D'Agata became an example to many in his native Italy, where some boxing fans still regard him as a hero. In addition to enduring disabilities, he also survived an attempt on his life before becoming a world champion, after being shot in the chest by a business partner in Australia, on 12 February 1955. This cost him a shot at the world bantamweight title, at the time held by Raul Macias.

Professional boxing record

See also
List of European Boxing Union bantamweight champions
Ramon Nery - another deaf professional boxer

References

External links

Mario D'Agata - CBZ Profile

|-

|-

 

|-

 

1926 births
Deaf martial artists
2009 deaths
Italian male boxers
Sportspeople from Arezzo
Italian deaf people
Bantamweight boxers